13 Stories is an Atlanta, Georgia based pop-band. Keyboards and leading vocals are provided by Cheri D, lead guitar is by Cat, bass guitar is by J3, and drums are by Max.  They have released a CD entitled FunkyPopSexyHouseRap with the single Beep! Beep!.  Beep! Beep! was used in 2006 for a series of television commercials for Ford automobiles which featured not only the song, but also the band playing it.

External links
 13 Stories website 
 April 27, 2006 column about the band in The State newspaper  (dead link, article is now in paid archive section)
The band's MySpace page Hear/download songs, including Beep Beep

American pop music groups
Musical groups from Georgia (U.S. state)